Charlie Weir was a professional middleweight boxer from South Africa.

Early life
Charles Henry Hughwright Weir (Charlie Weir) was born in Kimberley on 26 November 1956.  After completing his compulsory National Service, he became a professional boxer.  He had 34 professional bouts, of which he won 31.

Weir had a distinctive patch of white hair which made him immediately recognisable and earned him the nickname of the "Silver Assassin".
He fought Davey Moore for the WBA Junior Middleweight title in 1982 in Johannesburg, but lost in a 5th-round KO.

Weir died of cancer on 19 June 1992 at the age of 35.

External links

1956 births
1992 deaths
Middleweight boxers
White South African people
South African male boxers